Romont railway station is a railway station in the municipality of Romont, in the Swiss canton of Fribourg. It is located at the junction of the standard gauge Lausanne–Bern line of Swiss Federal Railways and the Bulle–Romont line of Transports publics Fribourgeois.

Services 
 the following services stop at Romont:

 RER Fribourg:
  / :
 Weekends: hourly service to Ins.

References

External links 
 
 

Railway stations in the canton of Fribourg
Swiss Federal Railways stations